The Black Warrior Basin is a geologic sedimentary basin of western Alabama and northern Mississippi in the United States.  It is named for the Black Warrior River and is developed for coal and coalbed methane production, as well as for conventional oil and natural gas production. Coalbed methane of the Black Warrior Basin has been developed and in production longer than in any other location in the United States. The coalbed methane is produced from the Pennsylvanian Pottsville Coal Interval.

The Black Warrior basin was a foreland basin during the Ouachita Orogeny during the Pennsylvanian and Permian Periods. The basin also received sediments from the Appalachian orogeny during the Pennsylvanian. The western margin of the basin lies beneath the sediments of the Mississippi embayment where it is contiguous with the Arkoma Basin of northern Arkansas and northeastern Oklahoma. The region existed as a quiescent
continental shelf environment through the early Paleozoic from the  Cambrian through the Mississippian with the deposition of shelf sandstones, shale, limestone, dolomite and chert.

References

Further reading
Hatch J.R. and M.J. Pawlewicz. (2007). Geologic assessment of undiscovered oil and gas resources of the Black Warrior Basin Province, Alabama and Mississippi [Digital Data Series 069-I]. Reston, VA: U.S. Department of the Interior, U.S. Geological Survey.

External links
Geological Survey of Alabama; Alabama State Oil and Gas Board
Pashin, J.C. (2005). Pottsville Stratigraphy and the Union Chapel Lagerstatte. (PDF) Pennsylvanian Footprints in the Black Warrior Basin of Alabama, Alabama Paleontological Society Monograph no.1. Buta, R. J., Rindsberg, A. K., and Kopaska-Merkel, D. C., eds.
Internet Map Application for the Black Warrior Basin Province, USGS Energy Resources Program, Map Service for the Black Warrior Basin Province, 2002 National Assessment of Oil and Gas

Sedimentary basins of North America
Coal mining regions in the United States
Coal mining in Appalachia
Geology of Alabama
Geology of Mississippi
Geologic provinces of the United States
Methane
Mining in Alabama
Mining in Mississippi